Minuscule 796 (in the Gregory-Aland numbering), δ161 (von Soden), is a Greek minuscule manuscript of the New Testament written on parchment. Palaeographically it has been assigned to the 11th century. The manuscript has no complex contents.
Formerly it was designated by 796e, 263a, and 312p.

Description 
The codex contains the text of the New Testament except Apocalypse, on 319 parchment leaves (size ), with some lacunae. It lacks texts of 2 Peter 3:14-1 John 2. Text of Hebrews 13:1-25 was supplied by a later hand on paper.

The order of books: Gospels, Acts, Catholic epistles, and Pauline epistles.

The text is written in one column per page, 34 lines per page.

There is also another division according to the smaller Ammonian Sections (in Mark 240 sections, the last in 16:9). There is no references to the Eusebian Canons.

It contains subscriptions added by a later hand.

Text 
The Greek text of the codex is a representative of the Byzantine text-type. Hermann von Soden classified it to the textual family Iκ. Aland did not place it in any Category.

According to the Claremont Profile Method it represent the textual family Kx in Luke 1, Luke 10, and Luke 20.

History 
According to Gregory the manuscript was written in the 11th century. The manuscript is currently dated by the INTF to the 11th century.

The manuscript was noticed in catalogue from 1876.

It was added to the list of New Testament manuscripts by Gregory (796). Gregory saw the manuscript in 1886.

The manuscript is now housed at the National Library of Greece (160) in Athens.

See also 

 List of New Testament minuscules
 Biblical manuscript
 Textual criticism
 Minuscule 795

References

Further reading

External links 
 Minuscule 796 at the CSNTM.

Greek New Testament minuscules
11th-century biblical manuscripts
Manuscripts of the National Library of Greece